Jørgen Strand Larsen (born 6 February 2000) is a Norwegian professional footballer who plays as a forward for La Liga club Celta and the Norway national team.

Club career

Early career
Early youth training at GKvik Halden FK。later joined Sarpsborg 08 FF。Larsen made his debut as a substitute against Vålerenga Football on 21 May 2017。On April 26 against Drøbak-Frogn IL, larsen completed a hat trick in the team, and finally Sarpsborg defeated Drøbak-Frogn 10:1。Later loaned to AC Milan youth team。
In 2017, Larsen was nominated by the British media Guardian as one of the 60 great talented football players in the world. The other nominated Norwegian is Erling Haaland

FC Groningen
September 1, 2020 Larsen signed a four-year contract with Eredivisie FC Groningen。Larsen made his first Eredivisie debut as a starter against PSV Eindhoven in which he contributed 1 assist，But in the end FC Groningen lost 1:3。On October 25th, against Fortuna Sittard, Larsen scored two goals, and finally FC Groningen won the match 3:1。.After that, he scored against RKC Waalwijk, Go Ahead Eagles andFortuna Sittard, and won the last two games. Larsen was selected as one of the best teams in the Eredivisie for November。Larsen has performed well in the Eredivisie。 He played 71 times in the league, scoring 27 goals and assisting 9times. Therefore awarded FC Groningen Player of the Year in May 2022。His last Eredivisie match was a 1-1 draw against NEC Nijmegen。

RC Celta de Vigo
During the summer transfer period of 2022, Middlesbrough and Bologna wanted to buy Larsen, but in the end Larsen joined the La Liga team Celta Vigo for 11 million euros.。September 2nd. Larsen made his official debut in La Liga against Cádiz CF. Larsen contributed 1 assist in the game and the team won 3:0。Later, in the game against Barcelona, ​​Larsen scored a goal in the second half, but the ball was ruled offside and missed the first La Liga goal，Larsen still did not score in the subsequent leagues, so he was criticized until January 13, 2023 against Villarreal CF Larsen replaced Oscar Rodriguez in the second half and scored in the 68th minute, winning his first goal in La Liga.In the end, Celta and villarreal drew 1:1

On February 4, when Celta played against Real Betis , Larsen scored a goal in five minutes and assisted at the end of the first half. In the end, Celta won 3 points with 4:3  Real Betis . Larsen contributed 1 goal and 1 assist in this game, so he was shortlisted for one of the best teams in the 20th round of La Liga.

International career

Youth 
Larsen represented Norway at under-16 under-17, under-18, under-19 and under-21 youth levels。Larsen played in the  2017 UEFA European Under-17 Championship, scored a goal against the Netherlands in the group stage, and the final two teams drew 1:1。Larsen scored twice in the group stage against Croatia at the U19 European Championships in 2019, helping Norway to victory。Completed a hat-trick against Gibraltar in the group stage of the 2020 U21 European Championship, Norway won by a wide margin of 6:0

Senior 
November 2020. Larsen was selected for the national team for the first time. Started 86 minutes against Austria in the Europa League before being replaced by Andreas Vindheim

November 19, 2022 Larsen withdrew from the international friendly against Finland due to unwell

Style of play
Larsen is a tall physical striker who is proficient with his back to goal, as well as possessing the technical ability to link up play with his teammates. He is a consistent threat inside of the opposition’s box due to his aerial prowess and his capacity to score goals from close range. Larsen has been praised for his technical proficiency on the ball, and off the ball positioning. His style of play has been compared to that of compatriot Erling Haaland.

Personal life
Larsen is a Liverpool F.C.fan

Career statistics

International

Honours
Norway U17
Syrenka Cup: 2016

References

2000 births
Living people
People from Halden
Sportspeople from Viken (county)
Norwegian footballers
Association football forwards
Norway international footballers
Norway under-21 international footballers
Norway youth international footballers
Eliteserien players
Eredivisie players
La Liga players
Sarpsborg 08 FF players
FC Groningen players
RC Celta de Vigo players
Norwegian expatriate footballers
Norwegian expatriate sportspeople in Italy
Expatriate footballers in Italy
Norwegian expatriate sportspeople in the Netherlands
Expatriate footballers in the Netherlands
Norwegian expatriate sportspeople in Spain
Expatriate footballers in Spain